This is a list of universities in the United States that sponsored football at one time but have since discontinued their programs. The last season that the school fielded a football team is included.

Schools are split up based on their current athletics affiliation. The affiliation of the football team while it was active may have been different.

Division I schools

Division II schools

Division III schools

NAIA schools

USCAA schools

NCCAA schools

NJCAA schools

Schools without athletics

Closed or merged schools

International schools
 Canada
University College of Cape Breton (1990)
Dalhousie University (1976)
Laurentian University (1971)
Loyola College (Montreal) (1974), merged with Sir George Williams University to become Concordia University
Macdonald College, merged with McGill University (1973)
University of New Brunswick (1980)
University of Prince Edward Island (1979)
Université du Québec à Montréal (1972)
Université du Québec à Trois-Rivières (1979)
Royal Military College of Canada (1972)
St. Patrick's College, merged with Carleton University (1966)
Sir George Williams University (1972)

 Cuba
University of Havana (c. 1958)

 Guam
University of Guam (c. 1981)

 Mexico
Borregos Salvajes ITESM Torreón (2004)
Cóndores UNAM (1997)	
Heroico Colegio Militar (c. 1952)
Lobos	Universidad Autónoma de Coahuila (unknown)	
Mexico City College (c. 1954)	
Pieles Rojas	ESIQIE-IPN (1998)

 United Kingdom
Aberdeen Steamroller
Aston Rhinos
Cambridge Pythons
Dundee Bluedevils
Eton (1873)
Manchester MPs
Strathclyde Hawks

See also
List of defunct college basketball teams
List of defunct men's college ice hockey teams
List of NCAA Division I schools that have never sponsored football
List of NCAA institutions with club football teams
List of NCAA Division I non-football programs
List of NCAA Division I institutions
List of NCAA Division II institutions
List of NCAA Division III institutions

References

Defunct
College Football
+
College football